Nestor Omar Piccoli (born January 20, 1965) is a former Argentine football player.

He was the first top scorer of the Japanese third tier, scoring 18 goals with Chuo Bohan F.C., forerunner to Avispa Fukuoka. He moved with the team from Fujieda to Fukuoka and retired with them after their promotion to the Japanese top division.

After he retired from playing, Piccoli became a football coach. He worked as an assistant to Julio César Falcioni with Boca Juniors.

Managerial statistics

References

External links

J League entry (Japanese)

1965 births
Living people
Argentine footballers
Argentine expatriate footballers
Club Atlético River Plate footballers
Unión de Santa Fe footballers
Club de Gimnasia y Esgrima La Plata footballers
Japan Soccer League players
Japan Football League (1992–1998) players
Avispa Fukuoka players
Expatriate footballers in Japan
Argentine football managers
J1 League managers
Avispa Fukuoka managers
Association football forwards
Footballers from Buenos Aires